Walter Calverley was an English squire and murderer.

Walter Calverley may also refer to:

Sir Walter Calverley, 1st Baronet (1670–1749), English aristocrat
Walter Calverley-Blackett (1707–1777), British baronet and politician

See also
Calverley (surname)